The 2010–11 MŽRKL was the 10th season of the WABA League. The study included twelve teams from five countries, a champion for the fifth time in team history became Šibenik. In this season participating clubs from Serbia, Montenegro, Bosnia and Herzegovina, Croatia and Slovenia.

The season has begun on 6 October 2010 and ended on 20 February 2011, when he it was completed a Regular season. Final Four to be played from 5–6 March 2011. in Šibenik, Croatia. Winner Final Four this season for the team Šibenik from Croatia.

Team information

Regular season 
The League of the season was played with 12 teams and play a dual circuit system, each with each one game at home and away. The four best teams at the end of the regular season were placed in the Final Four. The regular season began on 6 October 2010 and it will end on 20 February 2011.

Final four 
The Final Four was played from 5–6 March 2011 in the Baldekin Hall in Šibenik, Croatia.

Awards 
 Player of the Year: Ana Turčinović (190-C-93) of Merkur Celje 
 Guard of the Year: Nika Barič (169-G-92) of Merkur Celje 
 Forward of the Year: Neda Lokas (182-F-85) of Šibenik 
 Center of the Year: Ana Turčinović (190-C-93) of Merkur Celje 
 Import Player of the Year: Maurita Reid (173-G-85) of Gospić 
 European Player of the Year: Ana Turčinović (190-C-93) of Merkur Celje 
 Defensive Player of the Year: Ana Turčinović (190-C-93) of Merkur Celje 
 Coach of the Year: Ante Nerber of Šibenik Jolly 

1st Team
 G: Maurita Reid (173-85) of Gospić 
 G: Nika Barič (169-92) of Merkur Celje 
 F: Neda Lokas (182-85) of Šibenik 
 F/C: Michelle Maslowski (188-79) of Gospić 
 C: Ana Turčinović (190-93) of Merkur Celje 

2nd Team
 G: Dajana Butulija (175-86) of Partizan 
 G: Jelena Ivezić (184-84) of Gospić 
 F: Gordana Bedalov (193-84) of Medveščak 
 F/C: Kristina Baltić (187-90) of Maribor 
 C: Marija Vrsaljko (195-89) of Gospić 

Honorable Mention
 Britany Miller (193-C-87) of Novi Zagreb 
 Petra Štampalija (190-C-80) of Šibenik 
 Nataša Popović (190-C-82) of Jedinstvo Bijelo Polje 
 Ana Krstović (187-C-83) of Voždovac 
 Kristina Baltić (187-F/C-90) of Maribor 
 Ljubica Kure (178-G-81) of Maribor 

All-European Players Team
 G: Dajana Butulija (175-86) of Partizan 
 G: Nika Barič (169-92) of Merkur Celje 
 F: Neda Lokas (182-85) of Šibenik Jolly 
 F/C: Kristina Baltić (187-90) of Maribor 
 C: Ana Turčinović (190-93) of Merkur Celje

External links 
 2010–11 MŽRKL at eurobasket.com
 2010–11 MŽRKL at srbijasport.net

2010-11
2010–11 in European women's basketball leagues
2010–11 in Serbian basketball
2010–11 in Bosnia and Herzegovina basketball
2010–11 in Slovenian basketball
2010–11 in Montenegrin basketball
2010–11 in Croatian basketball